Attic Records was a Canadian independent record label, founded in 1974 by Alexander Mair and Tom Williams.  The label was known for developing Canadian talent, including Anvil, Lee Aaron, Maestro Fresh Wes, The Nylons, Teenage Head, and Triumph.  The company was also active in distributing international acts not affiliated with a major label, most successfully with Jennifer Warnes, "Weird Al" Yankovic, Katrina and the Waves, and Creed.

Attic Records ceased to exist as an independent company in 1999, when it was bought by a consortium headed by Allan Gregg and merged with TMP (The Music Publisher) and Oasis Entertainment Distribution to form The Song Corporation. The Attic label briefly continued to exist as a subsidiary of The Song Corporation, but within months of its acquisition, the label name was changed to "Song Recordings".

The Song Corporation filed for bankruptcy in May 2001. Attic's Canadian catalog and masters are now owned by Unidisc Music.

Artists 

Aaron Carter
Adrian Zmed
Anvil
Lee Aaron
Blind Vengeance
Body Electric
 The Bop Cats
Rob McConnell & The Boss Brass
 Coal Chamber
Sara Craig
Creed (Canada only, 1997–99)
Downchild Blues Band
Shirley Eikhard
Fludd
The Frantics
 Fun Factory
Patsy Gallant
Goblin
Goddo
Hagood Hardy
Haywire
 House of Pain
The Irish Rovers
Jazmin
Jennifer Warnes
 Jerry Cantrell
Michaele Jordana
Junkie XL
Judas Priest
Kamahl
Katrina and the Waves
Ken Tobias
Killer Dwarfs
Klaatu
 Life of Agony
The Lincolns founded by Prakash John
Lio
M-Appeal
 Machine Head
MacLean & MacLean
Maestro Fresh Wes
Motörhead
Dutch Mason
Belinda Metz
Digital Underground
Elton Motello
The Nylons
 The Orb
The Bopcats
Plastic Bertrand
 Queen of the Stones Age
Raggadeath
Razor
Rita Coolidge
Ron Nigrini
Run DMC
Annie Ryan
Secret Service
 Sepultura
 Skee-lo
 Slipknot
The Soft Boys
 Soulfly
Teenage Head
George Thorogood
Ken Tobias
Toyah
Triumph
Type O Negative
Wayne County & the Electric Chairs
Warriors
Jesse Winchester
Rick Worrall
"Weird Al" Yankovic

See also 

 List of record labels

References

 
Record labels established in 1974
Record labels disestablished in 1999
Canadian independent record labels
Rock record labels
Defunct record labels of Canada